The Roman Catholic Diocese of São José dos Campos is a diocese located in the city of São José dos Campos, in the Ecclesiastical province of Aparecida in Brazil.

History
 January 30, 1981: Established as Diocese of São José dos Campos from the Diocese of Mogi das Cruzes and Diocese of Taubaté

Bishops
 Bishops of São José dos Campos (Latin Church)
 Bishop Eusébio Oscar Scheid, S.C.I. Dehonians (1981.02.11 – 1991.01.23), appointed Archbishop of Florianópolis, Santa Catarina (Cardinal in 2003)
Bishop José Nelson Westrupp, S.C.I. (1991.05.11 – 2003.10.01), appointed Bishop of Santo André, São Paulo
Bishop Moacir Silva (2004.10.20 – 2013.04.24), appointed Archbishop of Ribeirão Preto by Pope Francis
Bishop José Valmor César Teixeira, S.D.B. (2014.03.20 - present)

Other priests of this diocese who became bishops
Dimas Lara Barbosa was appointed Auxiliary Bishop of São Sebastião do Rio de Janeiro in 2003

References
 GCatholic.org
 Catholic Hierarchy
  Diocese website (Portuguese)

Roman Catholic dioceses in Brazil
São José dos Campos, Roman Catholic Diocese of
Christian organizations established in 1981
Roman Catholic dioceses and prelatures established in the 20th century